American rock band Kiss has released twenty studio albums and sixty singles. The group, formed in New York City in 1973, first consisted of bassist Gene Simmons, rhythm guitarist Paul Stanley, lead guitarist Ace Frehley, and drummer Peter Criss. It is the most recognizable and successful line-up, which lasted until Criss' departure in 1980. The band is known for its make-up and on-stage antics, which influenced many artists who later used similar effects in their concerts.

The band's eponymous debut album was released in 1974. The album did not have a hit single and rose only as high as 87 on Billboard, despite significant touring and promotion. The follow-up album, Hotter Than Hell (1974), was a bigger disappointment, peaking at 100 and quickly dropping off the charts. Dressed To Kill, released in 1975, was a much bigger success, breaking into Top-40, but the band's record label, Casablanca Records, was close to bankruptcy and needed a commercial breakthrough. This would later be achieved with both Kiss' and Casablanca's first Top-10 album, the double-live album Alive!, which featured the number 12 hit "Rock and Roll All Nite". The next three albums, Destroyer, Rock and Roll Over, and Love Gun were successful, achieving Platinum status and spawning Top-20 singles (including the number 7 ballad "Beth", the band's highest-charting single in the US).

Their seventh studio release, Dynasty, while being a musical departure, was a global success, thanks largely to the worldwide hit, "I Was Made for Lovin' You". The next three albums, Unmasked, Music From "The Elder" and Creatures of the Night, were domestic commercial failures, even as the band maintained popularity in many other parts of the world. Lick It Up was the first album featuring the band without make-up and was certified gold. Their next studio releases (Animalize; Asylum; Crazy Nights; Smashes, Thrashes & Hits) were more successful and Kiss recaptured some of their earlier glory (though not to the level of their 1970s heyday). Hot in the Shade was the lowest charting album of the unmasked era in the US, despite the success of the top 10 power ballad "Forever".

With their 16th studio release, Revenge, Kiss attempted to modernize their sound for the 1990s with heavier songs. The album initially charted at #6 on the Billboard 200, and quickly reached Gold status in the US. 1997's Carnival of Souls: The Final Sessions was released after the reunion tour and did not receive much promotion. It has yet to be certified Gold in the US despite the album's lone single "Jungle" reaching number 8 on the US Hot Mainstream Rock Tracks. Followed by a highly successful reunion, in 1998 Psycho Circus was released and was a moderate success. Their first album in 11 years, Sonic Boom, was released in 2009. The band released their 20th studio album, Monster, on October 9, 2012. To date, Kiss has had 25 million copies certified by the RIAA in the United States. The band has 30 gold albums as of July 2015.

The Kiss discography also includes a large number of unofficial releases - bootlegs. Most of them are live performances - audience recordings, radio broadcasts or soundboard recordings - but there are also unofficial releases featuring unreleased studio recordings. Some bootlegs are known to include fake "Kiss" songs recorded by other bands.

Albums

Studio albums

'78 solo albums

Live albums

Instant Live album series

Compilation albums

Box sets

Singles

 A  The single was first released with "Dirty Livin'" as the A-side and "Sure Know Something" as the B-side when it reached no. 25, and later released with "Sure Know Something" as the A-side and "Dirty Livin'" as the B-side.

The singles "Beth" and "I Was Made for Lovin' You" have been certified Gold by the RIAA and CRIA.
The single "Psycho Circus" has been certified Gold by the IFPI Sweden.

 B  The single reached number 2 in Japan.

'78 solo singles

Other appearances

Album appearances

Unreleased on album 

2015: Scooby-Doo! and Kiss: Rock and Roll Mystery - "Don't Touch My Ascot"

Videography

Video albums

Films

TV series
In 2010 Love theme from KISS appeared in the movie Somewhere, directed by Sofia Coppola.
 Kiss in the 1998 Millennium episode "...Thirteen Years Later".
 Kiss was also featured in the Family Guy episodes "A Very Special Family Guy Freakin' Christmas" and "Road to Europe".
 In 2002, Kiss filmed a music video with the cast of the popular sitcom That '70s Show to announce that the show was going into syndication. The half-hour special showed behind the scenes of the making of the video. The half-hour special, called That '70s Kiss Show, aired on VH1.
 Gene Simmons makes a cameo appearance in the 2008 movie Detroit Metal City (a live action adaptation of the manga of the same name) as Jack ill Dark, a legendary Black metal guitarist from the United States.
 Gene Simmons and Paul Stanley appeared as themselves in the 2009 Fairly OddParents episode "Wishology Part 1: The Big Beginning."
 Kiss appeared on the season finale of American Idol in 2009 and 2014 during results shows in which they performed with Adam Lambert and Caleb Johnson.
 Gene Simmons appears as himself on the CSI: Crime Scene Investigation episode "Long Road Home".
 Gene Simmons makes an appearance on Castle, in the episode "To Love and Die in L.A." as a friend of the murder victim whose case Castle and Beckett investigate.
 They also appear in an episode of What's New, Scooby-Doo? performing as themselves, they later appeared in the Scooby-Doo movie Scooby-Doo! and Kiss: Rock and Roll Mystery.
Gene Simmons and Paul Stanley appear in the 2016 comedy film Why Him? as themselves.
In 1976 Kiss appeared in The Paul Lynde Halloween Special as themselves.
In 1998, Kiss appeared on the Mad TV Halloween special, performing comedy skits, but not singing.

Music videos

Lyric videos

See also
List of songs recorded by Kiss

Notes

References

External links
Official discography

Discography
Heavy metal group discographies
Discographies of American artists

ca:Kiss#Discografia